Lewis Henry Hawkins (born 15 June 1993) is an English footballer who plays as a midfielder for Whitby Town.

Hawkins has previously played for Hartlepool United, York City, Spennymoor Town, Blyth Spartans and Guisborough Town.

Career
Hawkins was born in Middlesbrough, Yorkshire.

Hartlepool United
He started his career in the youth team of Hartlepool United on a two-year scholarship. In September 2011, Hawkins was sent on work experience to Whitby Town of the Northern Premier League Premier Division. He made seven appearances for Whitby, one of which came in the FA Cup. He made his first-team debut on 10 March 2012, in a 0–0 draw with Walsall, replacing the injured James Poole in the starting line-up.

Hawkins joined Spennymoor Town on 6 February 2015 on a one-month loan, but was recalled by Hartlepool manager Ronnie Moore after three matches, with Spennymoor boss Jason Ainsley saying: "He has been brilliant in his spell for us, even though he only played three games. He gave us an extra dimension". Hawkins rejoined Spennymoor on 20 October on a three-month loan.

Hawkins scored his first two goals in professional football within six minutes of each other in a 3–1 win over Barnet in March 2016. His first goal of the match won Hartlepool's Goal of the Season award.

Hawkins signed a new one-year contract with the club at the end of the 2017–18 season. He joined National League North club York City on 3 November 2018 on loan until 3 January 2019. He made his debut on the same day as joining, starting in a 4–1 defeat at home to Bradford (Park Avenue) in the league. Hawkins was recalled by Hartlepool on 15 December 2018. He made nine appearances in all competitions for York, scoring once in an FA Trophy game against Kidderminster Harriers.

Hawkins joined National League North club Spennymoor Town on 22 March 2019 on loan until the end of the 2018–19 season. On 1 May 2019, Hawkins scored the winner for Spennymoor in their play-off quarter final game against Bradford Park Avenue and four days later, he scored the winning penalty in the penalty shoot-out against Brackley Town to send Spennymoor through to the National League North play-off final against Chorley.

Hawkins was released by Hartlepool at the end of the 2018–19 season.

Guisborough Town
Following his release from Hartlepool, Hawkins went on trial with National League side Yeovil Town in July 2019. The following month, Hawkins signed for Northern League Division One side Guisborough Town making his debut in a 2–0 victory over Seaham Red Star.

Blyth Spartans
Hawkins moved to National League North side Blyth Spartans on 31 August 2019. Hawkins left Blyth at the end of the end of 2019–2020 season following the expiration of his contract. He played 27 times for Blyth in all competitions, scoring twice.

Whitby Town
On 26 August 2020, Hawkins signed for Whitby Town the club he had previously played for on loan while at Hartlepool. He made his second debut for The Seasiders in a 1-1 draw in the FA Cup first qualifying round against Warrington Rylands in September 2020.

At the end of the 2021–22 season, Hawkins signed a new one-year contract with Whitby.

Career statistics

References

External links
Profile at the Hartlepool United F.C. website

1993 births
Living people
Footballers from Middlesbrough
English footballers
Association football midfielders
Hartlepool United F.C. players
Whitby Town F.C. players
Spennymoor Town F.C. players
York City F.C. players
Guisborough Town F.C. players
Blyth Spartans A.F.C. players
Northern Premier League players
English Football League players
National League (English football) players
Northern Football League players